"Piece of My Heart" is a song written by Jerry Ragovoy and Bert Berns, best known through performances by Janis Joplin.

Piece of My Heart may also refer to:

Film and television
 Piece of My Heart (film), a 2009 New Zealand film
 A Piece of My Heart (film), a 2019 Swedish film
 "Piece of My Heart" (Grey's Anatomy), a television episode

Literature
 Piece of My Heart (novel), a 2006 Inspector Banks novel by Peter Robinson
 Piece of My Heart, a 2020 Under Suspicion novel by Mary Higgins Clark and Alafair Burke
 A Piece of My Heart, a 1976 novel by Richard Ford

Music
 "Piece of My Heart" (Intermission song), 1993
 "Piece of My Heart" (Tara Kemp song), 1991
 Piece of My Heart, a 1996 album by Faith Hill
 "A Piece of My Heart", a song by Gang of Four from Hard
 Piece of My Heart: The Bert Berns Story, a 2014 jukebox musical